The Sony Ericsson Xperia arc is an Android smartphone launched on 24 March 2011 in Japan, and 1 April 2011 in Europe.

It belongs to Sony's large family of Xperia smartphones and tablets. This family was launched in 2008 by a joint-venture initiated in 2001 between Sony and Ericsson. Sony bought Ericsson's stake in the joint-venture in 2012 and since 2012 all new Xperia products have been branded only Sony. The Xperia arc is also known as Anzu or X12 or LT15i, LT15a... (the ending letter, in the 'LT15~' names -also often written with small caps 'lt15~'-, indicates different models, in particular related to geography.)

It has a  touch-screen, the mobile BRAVIA engine which optimises the picture and runs at a resolution of 854×480 pixels, a 1 GHz Qualcomm Snapdragon processor, an 8.1 mega-pixel camera, micro-HDMI-out and 512 MB of RAM. The name of the handset refers to the arc-like side silhouette.

The Sony Ericsson Xperia arc is available in four colors: Midnight Blue, Misty Silver, Pink (Japan and South Korea), Black (US), and White and Black (South Korea and Mexico only).

Hardware 
The display is a 4.2 inch capacitive touchscreen with a resolution of 854 × 480. It supports multi-touch, is scratch resistant and features the mobile BRAVIA engine from Sony and is capable of displaying 16,777,216 colours.

The camera is an 8.1 megapixels Exmor R sensor and is capable of recording video at 720p high-definition. It also has an LED flash.

Storage on the device is 1 GB with 320 MB free for user storage, this is expandable to up to 32 GB with a microSD card.

The Xperia arc too features only 3 hardware keys, unlike the usual 4-key pattern seen in Android phones. The search key has been removed, and instead, the user can directly search by long-pressing the menu key.

Basics 
The Xperia arc operates on Android 2.3 (Gingerbread) with a slightly changed launcher. The device is compatible with Android 4.0 Ice Cream Sandwich, and Sony released an official update to 4.0 for unlocked units in early June 2012. Availability of the update for branded/carrier locked units is dependent on the carrier to offer it.

The display features a Sony Mobile BRAVIA Engine which offers enhanced picture and video viewing on the 4.2" display.

It also features an Exmor R sensor that allows the capture of high definition movies and stills in low lit areas, which can then be shown on an HDTV via the HDMI connector.

The arc S lacks a frontal camera. Also, the memory card is not hot-swappable.

Reception
The Xperia arc was first revealed on 6 January 2011 at CES 2011.

See also
 Sony Ericsson Xperia arc S
 List of Xperia devices
 Xperia acro was developed from the Xperia arc.
 Galaxy Nexus

References

External links
 Xperia Arc official website 
 Whitepaper PDF with technical details

Android (operating system) devices
Sony Ericsson smartphones
Mobile phones introduced in 2011